Maalpiku Island National Park, or Restoration Island, is a national park at Iron Range in the Shire of Cook in Far North Queensland, Australia, 1928 km (1198 miles) northwest of Brisbane and a few hundred metres (yards) from Cape Weymouth and the Kutini-Payamu National Park.  The park includes part of Restoration Island and nearby Restoration Rock.

Environment
The continental island rises to 116 m (380'). The landscape features granite boulders, closed scrub, open paperbark scrub and wind-sheared heath.

History
On 29 May 1789, after the mutiny on the Bounty, Captain Bligh and the men who remained loyal to him arrived on the island in the ship's boat. This was the first Australian island they came to, and he named it Restoration Island because the food they found (oysters and native fruits) greatly restored their spirits and because that date was Oak Apple Day, the anniversary of the restoration of King Charles II (in 1660).

Bligh saw evidence of the local aborigines using the island (rough huts and places fires had been made).  He also saw kangaroo tracks and wondered if the aborigines brought them from the mainland to breed, since they would be easier to catch later in the confined space of an island.  (When leaving the following day he saw aborigines on an opposite shore, but did not communicate with them.)

David Glasheen
Today Restoration Island is not just a National Park; one third of the island is leased to David Glasheen, a former mining tycoon, who, after losing his fortune during the 1987 stock market crash, decided to live a solitary existence on the island.

Glasheen lives in a renovated World War II outpost on Ma'alpiku Island with solar powered internet access and a mobile phone. He also has a small boat for reaching the mainland whenever necessary and several times a year he makes a trip to the mainland for groceries. He gathers bananas and coconuts from the island, catches crabs, fish, and oysters and has a fruit and vegetable garden. 

In July 2019 David Glasheen and Neil Bramwell released The Millionaire Castaway, published by Affirm Press, detailing David Glasheen's experiences of being a castaway on Restoration Island for the past 22 years.

Traditional owners
The island contains places of cultural significance to the traditional owners. In 2009, formal native title was granted over the island to the Kuuku Ya’u people.  The park is now jointly managed between the Northern Kuuku Ya’u Kanthanampu Aboriginal Corporation RNTBC Land Trust and the Government of Queensland.

Access
Access to the national park is provided by private boat only.

See also 

 Protected areas of Queensland

References

External links
More about Restoration Island and David Glasheen
Millionaire Castaway by David Glasheen and Neil Bramwell, Affirm Press 2019
Restoration Man, by Susan Chenery, Weekend Australian, July 20, 2019
New York Times article featuring Restoration Island resident David Glasheen
Ben Fogle: New Lives In The Wild featured David Glasheen and Restoration Island in its first season

National parks of Far North Queensland
Islands of Queensland
Protected areas established in 1989
1989 establishments in Australia